Kåre Mikkelsen Jonsborg (11 January 1912 – 10 July 1977) was a Norwegian painter and textile artist.

Background 
Kåre Jonsborg was born at Kristiania (now Oslo), Norway. He was the son of John Andreas Mikkelsen (1873-1944) and Anne Elise Ebbell (1884-1950). At five years of age, his family moved to Solør, where his father worked as an artsmith. He studied under Axel Revold, Jean Heiberg and Georg Jacobsen  at the Norwegian National Academy of Craft and Art Industry in Oslo from 1933-38. From 1965 until his death in 1977, he was employed by the Norwegian National Academy of Fine Arts.

Career
Jonsborg debuted at the Autumn Exhibition (Høstutstillingen) in Oslo during 1935. Three years later he won the 3rd prize in the competition for decoration in Oslo City Hall.

His works span from oil, tempera, woodcutting and through to stone mosaics. He created a number of altar pieces among others in Svalbard Church and Tonsen Church in Oslo. He also created a vast production of figurative paintings and tapestry designs including at Steinkjer Church. For many years he had a fruitful partnership with textile artist Else Halling (1899-1987), aiming to find a useful range of plant dyes for dying wool from spelsau. The cooperation resulted in significant achievements including designs for monumental tapestries in Oslo City Hall (woven by Else Halling).

In his art he was dedicated to geometrical theories of how to build and compose pictures, of the art and colour theories of Piero della Francesca, Paul Cézanne, Pablo Picasso og Eugène Delacroix. All his life he studied the old masters and travelled in Europe and collected a vast documentation of the masters' composition techniques.

He was an invited participant at the international biennale, "Biennale internationale de tapisserie" in the Cantonal Museum of Fine Arts in Lausanne and is discussed in the work of Pierre Verlet-Michel Florisone and Adolf Hoffmeister-Francois Tabard: Le grand livre de la tapisserie (Paris: Bibliothèque des arts, 1965).
He was awarded a number of distinctions including Schlytters og Mohrs legat (1939), Statens reisestipend (1952) and Thomas Fearnleys Minnestipend (1955). He is represented in the National Gallery in Oslo and was awarded the King's Medal of Merit
(Kongens fortjenstmedalje).

References

Other Sources
Waadeland, Ruth (2008) Kunstneren Kåre Mikkelsen Jonsborg: jakobineren fra de store skoger (Trondheim : Tapir akademisk forl) 	

1912 births
1977 deaths
People from Grue, Norway
20th-century Norwegian painters
Norwegian tapestry artists
Norwegian woodcarvers
Oslo National Academy of the Arts alumni
Academic staff of the Oslo National Academy of the Arts
Recipients of the King's Medal of Merit